The Tessier Biplane is a single place homebuilt biplane.

Development
The Tessier biplane is a single place tube and fabric construction aircraft with conventional landing gear. The wing spar is wood and ribs are plywood. The original engine was a Volkswagen air-cooled engine which was replaced with a Lawrance L-5 radial engine.

Aircraft on display
The original Tessier Biplane belongs to the EAA AirVenture Museum, but is neither airworthy nor on display.

Specifications (Tessier Biplane)

See also

References

Homebuilt aircraft